Rafael González (29 April 1920 – 21 August 2007) was an Argentine fencer. He competed at the 1960 and 1964 Summer Olympics.

References

1920 births
2007 deaths
Argentine male fencers
Argentine sabre fencers
Olympic fencers of Argentina
Fencers at the 1960 Summer Olympics
Fencers at the 1964 Summer Olympics
Fencers from Buenos Aires
Pan American Games medalists in fencing
Pan American Games silver medalists for Argentina
Fencers at the 1959 Pan American Games
20th-century Argentine people